Coleophora sumptuosa is a moth of the family Coleophoridae. It is found in Romania and Iran.

References

sumptuosa
Moths of Europe
Moths described in 1952